Jung Chae-yeon (born December 1, 1997), known mononymously as Chaeyeon, is a South Korean singer and actress. She was known as a member of the girl group DIA and also a member of project girl group I.O.I after finishing 7th in the survival show Produce 101. She is also currently active as an actress, best known for her lead roles in the television series To. Jenny (2018), My First First Love (2019), The King's Affection (2021) and The Golden Spoon (2022).

Early life and education
Jung Chae-yeon was born on December 1, 1997, in Suncheon, South Jeolla Province, South Korea. She has a 2-year-old sister named Jeong Si-yeon. She attended School of Performing Arts Seoul from 2013 to 2016 with former DIA member Ahn Eun-jin. On February 4, 2016, she graduated from SOPA.

Career

2015: Debut with DIA

In January 2015, MBK Entertainment announced its plans to debut a new girl group, originally with a strategy to have candidates compete on a reality survival program. Once the idea was scrapped, however, the company decided to select its members internally and the final line-up was revealed with seven members, including Seung-hee, Cathy, Eunice, Jenny, Ye-bin, Eun-jin and Chae-yeon.

DIA released their debut album, Do It Amazing, on September 14, 2015, with the lead single "Somehow" (왠지; Waenji).

2016: Produce 101, I.O.I and acting debut

In December 2015, MBK Entertainment announced that Jung temporarily withdrew from the group to join the trainee survival program Produce 101, which she had auditioned for and signed contracts with before DIA officially debuted. She finished 7th overall with 215,338 votes, debuting with the I.O.I project group in May 2016. A week after their debut extended play Chrysalis was released, MBK Entertainment confirmed that Jung will return to DIA for their upcoming comeback in June 2016. YMC Entertainment revealed that she would be absent from I.O.I's sub-unit promotions as well. Her casting in tvN's Drinking Solo was confirmed on June 30, 2016, marking her acting debut.

DIA's second extended play, Spell was released on September 13, 2016, with the lead single "Mr. Potter". September 18–24, 2016 was noted for exceptionally busy television work for Jung, starting with bi-weekly broadcasts of Drinking Solo (September 19–20). Her appearance on Hit the Stage with fellow DIA member Eun-jin aired on September 21, 2016, and the premiere of the variety series Go Go with Mr. Paik aired on September 23, 2016, with her starring alongside Shinee's Onew. Combined with idol groups' tendency to perform on each of South Korea's daily music programs, a writer for Daily Sports noted that a viewer could see Jung's face virtually every day. She was revealed as the new face of jewelry brand Lamucha that same week, signing a one-year 200 million won contract.

Jung re-joined I.O.I for their second promotional cycle as a full group, releasing Miss Me? on October 17, 2016, with the lead single "Very Very Very". The October 21, 2016 broadcast of Music Bank marked an incident where due to scheduling conflicts, she performed on the show twice; once with DIA on their final run of televised performances for "Mr. Potter", and again with I.O.I. as they began promotions for "Very Very Very".

In December 2016, Jung was cast in the science fiction web drama 109 Strange Things, co-starring with Choi Tae-joon. She plays the role of senior philosophy student Shin Ki-won whose family takes in KDI-109, a robot from the future. The drama is set to air on Naver TV Cast in early 2017, with six episodes. She began modelling for Jill Stuart New York in January 2017.

2017–present: Acting success, rise of fame, and solo activities 
In 2017, Jung featured in SBS's romantic fantasy drama Reunited Worlds, playing the younger version of Lee Yeon-hee's character. She then starred in another science fiction web drama I Am, playing an android robot. In December, it was announced that Jung has joined the cast of SBS' reality survival show Law of the Jungle in Patagonia for their Chile special.

In 2018, Jung starred in KBS' weekend drama Marry Me Now, playing the younger version of Jang Mi-hee's character. She was also cast in her first film, Live Again, Love Again, which premiered in February 2018. The same month, Jung was announced as the new MC of SBS' music program Inkigayo. Jung was cast in the KBS music drama To. Jenny, her first leading role on television.

In 2019, Jung starred in the Netflix youth romance drama My First First Love.

On May 4, 2021, Jung and the members of I.O.I celebrated their 5th debut anniversary with a reunion live stream show called "Yes, I Love It!".

In 2022, Jung joined MBC's drama The Golden Spoon, which will air in the summer of 2022. In September, Jung signed an exclusive contract with BH Entertainment.

Discography

Singles

Filmography

Film

Television series

Web series

Television shows

Videography

Music videos

Songwriting credits
All song credits are adapted from the Korea Music Copyright Association's database, unless otherwise noted.

Awards and nominations

Notes

References

External links 

 
 

1997 births
Living people
South Korean female idols
South Korean women pop singers
Produce 101 contestants
School of Performing Arts Seoul alumni
I.O.I members
South Korean Protestants
South Korean television actresses
South Korean web series actresses
21st-century South Korean women singers
21st-century South Korean singers
21st-century South Korean actresses